Tabernaemontana rostrata grows as a shrub up to  tall. Its flowers feature a white corolla. The habitat is scrub or forest to  altitude. The species is native to Bangladesh, Indo-China and Malesia.

References

rostrata
Plants described in 1829
Flora of Bangladesh
Flora of Indo-China
Flora of Malesia